Aureil is a commune in the Haute-Vienne department in the Nouvelle-Aquitaine region in western France.

Hamlets
Main village with its town hall, school and church
Bost-Las-Mongeas: about 20 houses, mainly old, and an old chapel now part of a farm
Couderchoux: about 6 old houses

See also
Communes of the Haute-Vienne department

References

External links

Official website 

Communes of Haute-Vienne